Georgia Williams (born 25 August 1993) is a New Zealand professional racing cyclist, who currently rides for UCI Women's WorldTeam .

Career
She took up cycling whilst attending Albany Junior High School, where testing at the school's sports academy suggested that she was suited to the sport, having previously competed in netball and water polo.

She took two silver medals at the UCI Juniors Track World Championships: one in the team pursuit in 2010 and another in the individual pursuit in 2011. Williams joined the  team in 2013.  She competed at the 2014 Commonwealth Games. In 2016, she was part of the New Zealand team pursuit squads that finished fourth at the UCI Track Cycling World Championships and the 2016 Summer Olympics. In February 2017 it was announced that Williams would join  for the 2017 season. She won New Zealand's second ever medal in the women's road race at a Commonwealth Games, a silver medal in 2018, after Susy Pryde at the 1998 Commonwealth Games.

Major results

2009
 1st  Time trial, Oceania Junior Road Championships
2010
 2nd Team pursuit, UCI Junior Track World Championships (with Alexandra Neems, and Elizabeth Steel)
2011
 2nd Individual pursuit, UCI Junior Track World Championships
 3rd Time trial, Oceania Junior Road Championships
2012
 1st  Criterium, National Road Championships
2013
 National Road Championships
2nd Road race
3rd Time trial
 1st  Young rider classification Grand Prix Elsy Jacobs
 1st  Young rider classification Tour Languedoc Roussillon
 5th Overall Giro del Trentino Alto Adige-Südtirol
1st Stage 1a (TTT)
 8th Overall Thüringen Rundfahrt der Frauen
2014
 Oceania Track Championships
1st  Team pursuit (with Lauren Ellis, Jaime Nielsen and Racquel Sheath)
3rd Points race
 2nd Points race, BikeNZ Classic
2016
 2nd Road race, National Road Championships
2017
 National Road Championships
2nd Time trial
2nd Road race
2018
 National Road Championships
1st  Time trial
1st  Road race
 2nd  Road race, Commonwealth Games
 4th Overall Emakumeen Euskal Bira
 4th Tour of Guangxi Women's Elite World Challenge
 5th Overall Women's Herald Sun Tour
 6th Gooik–Geraardsbergen–Gooik
2019
 1st  Time trial, National Road Championships
2021
 National Road Championships
1st  Time trial
1st  Road race
2022
 1st  Time trial, National Road Championships

See also
 BePink-La Classica

References

External links

1993 births
Living people
New Zealand female cyclists
Cyclists at the 2014 Commonwealth Games
Cyclists at the 2016 Summer Olympics
Olympic cyclists of New Zealand
Cyclists from Auckland
People from Takapuna
Commonwealth Games silver medallists for New Zealand
Cyclists at the 2018 Commonwealth Games
Commonwealth Games medallists in cycling
20th-century New Zealand women
21st-century New Zealand women
Medallists at the 2018 Commonwealth Games